St Thomas a Becket is a Grade II listed Roman Catholic church at West Hill, Wandsworth, London SW18.

It was built in 1895 in a Perpendicular style, and the architect was Edward Goldie.

References 

Grade II listed churches in London
Roman Catholic churches in the London Borough of Wandsworth
Edward Goldie church buildings
Grade II listed buildings in the London Borough of Wandsworth
Grade II listed Roman Catholic churches in England